Anomalochelys ( or ) is an extinct genus of land turtle from the Upper Cretaceous of Hokkaido, Japan.

References

Late Cretaceous turtles of Asia
Trionychia
Fossils of Japan
Prehistoric turtles of Asia
Prehistoric turtle genera
Fossil taxa described in 2001